The Sri Lanka cricket team toured Ireland from 6 May to 8 May 2014 for a two-match One Day International (ODI) series.

Squads

ODI series

1st ODI

2nd ODI

See also
 2014 Irish cricket season

References

International cricket competitions in 2014
2014 in cricket